Javier Hernanz Agüeira (born 1 February 1983) is a Spanish sprint canoer and marathon canoeist. At the 2004 Summer Olympics, he was eliminated in the semifinals of the K-2 1000 m event.

In July 2015, he qualified for the 2016 Summer Olympics at K-4 1000 metres event.

References

External links
Sports-Reference.com profile

1983 births
Living people
Spanish male canoeists
Olympic canoeists of Spain
Canoeists at the 2004 Summer Olympics
Canoeists at the 2016 Summer Olympics
Medalists at the ICF Canoe Marathon World Championships
Real Grupo de Cultura Covadonga sportsmen
ICF Canoe Sprint World Championships medalists in kayak
21st-century Spanish people